The National Book Council Banjo Awards were presented by the National Book Council of Australia from 1974 to 1997 for works of fiction and non-fiction. The name commemorates the bush poet Andrew Barton Banjo Paterson. 
The Council has enjoyed notable leadership including Justice Michael Kirby and Professor Michael Fraser (1991–1998). Many notable Australian writers have been recipients for this award, including Peter Carey, Tim Winton, Alan Gould, Liam Davison, Sally Morrison, and Roger McDonald. In 1978 Helen Garner was the first woman to win the award for her novel Monkey Grip. The current Banjo Paterson Writing Award, established in 1991, is separate to the above awards, although similarly aims to commemorate the work of Banjo Paterson.

Winners
Source:

Fiction
 1975 William Nagle for The Odd Angry Shot 
 1978 Helen Garner for Monkey Grip
 1981 David Foster for Moonlight
 1982 Peter Carey for Bliss
 1985 Peter Carey for Illywhacker
 1988 Graeme Harper for Black Cat, Green Field 
 1989 Peter Carey for  Oscar and Lucinda
 1991 Glenda Adams for Longleg and Tim Winton for Cloudstreet
 1992 Alan Gould for To the Burning City 
 1993 Liam Davison for Soundings
 1994 Elizabeth Jolley for The Georges' Wife
 1995 Sally Morrison for Mad Meg
 1996 Rod Jones for Billy Sunday
 1997 Brian Castro for Stepper

Non-fiction
 1978 Kevin Gilbert for Living Black: Blacks Talk to Kevin Gilbert (1977)
 1981 Albert Facey for A Fortunate Life
 1993 Roger McDonald for Shearers' Motel
 1994 Hazel Rowley for Christina Stead: A Biography (1994)
 1996 Henry Reynolds

Notes
Notable shortlisted authors include 
Matthew Condon was shortlisted in 1992 for Usher and in 1995 for The Ancient Guild of Tycoons, 
Robert Dessaix for A Mother's Disgrace in 1994.
Garry Disher for The Sunken Road in 1996.
Richard Flanagan for Death of a River Guide (1995)
David Foster (novelist) for The Glade Within the Grove, 1996
Rodney Hall for Captivity Captive in 1989 and The Grisly Wife in 1994.  
Marion Halligan for Spider Cup in 1990 and Lovers' Knots: A Hundred-Year Novel in 1993
Susan Johnson (Australian author) A Big Life (1993); 
Alex Miller for The Ancestor Game (1993)

For other Australian literary awards, see List of Australian literary awards.

References 

Australian fiction awards
Australian non-fiction book awards
1997 disestablishments in Australia
1974 establishments in Australia